Fighting Spirit Magazine (FSM) was a monthly professional wrestling and mixed martial arts magazine published in the United Kingdom by Uncooked Media. The publication launched in 2006, becoming the UK's largest professional wrestling magazine. It folded in 2019, being merged into Wrestle Talk magazine.

Staff 
Sportswriter Brian Elliott was the editor of Fighting Spirit Magazine, having previously worked for the Belfast Telegraph in Northern Ireland. FSM feature columnists included professional wrestlers Stone Cold Steve Austin and Nick Aldis as well as Ring of Honor's former executive producer Jim Cornette. Guest columns were provided by Bret Hart, Mick Foley and Chris Jericho. Regular feature writers included Michael Campbell, Will Cooling, Justin Henry, John Lister, David Bixenspan and Richard Luck. Former Pro Wrestling Illustrated editor Bill Apter, who had a regular column before being replaced by Cornette, worked on the magazine in an administrative role. 

In April 2012, FSM announced that Cornette and Austin would be joining the magazine staff as columnists beginning with issue 79. The additions coincided with changes recently made to the magazine's editorial style, aiming to take a more formal and analytical attitude to reporting. In April 2014, editor Brian Elliott penned an article on the recently-passed Ultimate Warrior, which was re-published on the Wrestling Observer Newsletter site.

2008 dispute with WWE 
In September 2008, Fighting Spirit published a private memo sent by WWE to the gaming press covering the upcoming WWE SmackDown vs. Raw 2009. The memo instructed the press not to publish screenshots of any characters bleeding or using weapons. Specifically, the memo declared that no screenshots of wrestler Triple H could be used showing his character "in a defenseless or vulnerable position." In an article titled "Digital Politics" in issue #32, the magazine refused the WWE's demand and published a screenshot of Triple H being dominated by wrestler Kane. The magazine Power Slam later corroborated the memo.

FSM Reader Awards 
At the end of each year, FSM ran both an FSM Reader Awards poll, and the FSM 50.

FSM 50 
The FSM 50 listed the 50 best pro wrestlers in the world, as per the views of the magazine's staff. The FSM 50 first ran in 2014.

References

External links 
 
 Uncooked Media

Monthly magazines published in the United Kingdom
Sports magazines published in the United Kingdom
Magazines established in 2006
Martial arts magazines
Fighting Spirit magazine
2006 establishments in the United Kingdom
2019 disestablishments in the United Kingdom
Defunct magazines published in the United Kingdom
Magazines disestablished in 2019